Suparna Marwah, is an Indian TV and film actress, known for her work in the films Mujhse Fraaandship Karoge and Mere Brother Ki Dulhan. She appeared on TV's some mega-projects like Mahi Way, which was produced by film producers Aditya Chopra and Yash Chopra of Yash Raj Films under their new production house name YRF Television.

Filmography

Television

References

External links
 

Indian film actresses
Female models from Mumbai
Living people
Actresses in Hindi cinema
21st-century Indian actresses
Year of birth missing (living people)